Mark Morgan may refer to:
Mark Morgan (composer) (born 1961), American musician and composer
Mark Morgan (cricketer) (born 1980), English cricketer
Mark Morgan (producer), American film producer
Mark A. Morgan, current acting commissioner of U.S. Customs and Border Protection
Mark Morgan (swimmer), Australian swimmer